Mario Cordero Brenes  (7 April 1930 – 10 July 2002) was a Costa Rican football player and coach; he is still considered in his country as one of the top defenders to have played the game.

Club career
Better known as Catato or Piernas de Oro, he was part of the Deportivo Saprissa team that went on a World Tour in 1959, becoming the first Latin American team to ever do such a trip. Catato was the leader and captain of Deportivo Saprissa during the 1950s and early 1960s. He had one season in the Mexican league, with Atletico Marte. He retired after a game against Argentinian side Banfield on 25 December 1964. Catato is remembered as a player, for his chivalry in and out of the field, as well as his great positioning in the field, his great shoot and security as a defender.

International career
During those years, he played the same role in the Costa Rica national football team, making 41 appearances.

Managerial career
As coach, Catato guided Saprissa to four national titles in the 1960s, adding up to the four he had won previously as a player. He also managed Costa Rica's national team.

Death
He died of respiratory arrest on 10 July 2002 in the Rafael Angel Calderon Guardia Hospital in San José.

References

External links

1930 births
2002 deaths
Footballers from San José, Costa Rica
Costa Rican footballers
Costa Rica international footballers
Deportivo Saprissa players
Costa Rican expatriate footballers
Expatriate footballers in Mexico
Costa Rican football managers
Deportivo Saprissa managers
Deportivo Saprissa non-playing staff
Costa Rica national football team managers
Association football defenders